Alexander College is a private post-secondary institution in Burnaby, British Columbia, Canada. It was established in 2006 under the British Columbia Ministry of Advanced Education. 

The college offers undergraduate degree and transfer programs including University Transfer, Associate of Arts degrees and Associate of Science degrees. An integrated English for Academic Purposes program is also available to assist non-native English speakers with their transition to university level studies in the English language.

Alexander College is recognized and accredited by the BC Ministry of Advanced Education, Degree Quality Assurance Board (DQAB), BC Education Quality Assurance (EQA) program, and is a participant in the BC Transfer System, organized by the BC Council on Admissions and Transfer (BCCAT)

The academic year is divided into four terms: Fall (Sep. – Dec.), Winter (Jan. – Apr.), Spring (May – Jul.) and Summer intensive (Jul. – Aug.).

History 

Alexander College is named for Sir Alexander Mackenzie, the Scottish-born fur trade adventurer and author.

Established in 2006, Alexander College first offered University Transfer and English for Academic Purposes programs designed to help first and second year undergraduates. In the same year the college was approved to offer the Associate of Arts degree, followed by the Associate of Science degree in 2011.

Campus 

Alexander College operates a campus in the urban centre of Burnaby, British Columbia, Canada. Burnaby is a suburb in the geographic centre of the Greater Vancouver Regional District. The campus is on Kingsway across the Metropolis at Metrotown Mall. Facilities at the Burnaby campus include classrooms, science laboratory, Writing & Learning Centre, library, and bookstore.

The campus was constructed and opened to the public in the fall of 2021 after a several year development plan with help from the City of Burnaby and other contributors.

Subject areas 
Subject areas offered are:

 Asian Studies
 Biology
 Business Economics
 Chemistry
 Commerce
 Computer Science
 Economics
 English
 Film studies
 French
 History
 Mathematics
 Philosophy
 Physics
 Psychology
 Sociology
 Statistics
 University preparation

References 

Colleges in British Columbia
Education in Burnaby
2006 establishments in British Columbia